Dukes Highway is a 190 kilometre highway corridor in South Australia which is part of the link between the Australian cities of Adelaide and Melbourne. It is part of the National Highway system spanning Australia, and is signed as route A8.

Route
Dukes Highway commences at the intersection with Princes Highway in Tailem Bend and heads in a southeast direction to the state border with Victoria just east of Bordertown, continuing into Victoria as Western Highway, with the same route signage (route A8). It is mostly a single carriageway of one lane each way, plus a total of 36 overtaking lanes. Approximately  has "wide centre lines" providing a  boundary between traffic travelling in opposite directions.

Generally, the quality of Dukes Highway is of a high standard, with the entire road having wide lane widths and sealed shoulders with at least five (and usually six) metres clear beyond the edge line. The final 17 km of the highway after Bordertown, was originally built on unstable ground but was re-constructed in 2005. There are a total of 16 rest areas or parking bays along the Dukes Highway, at approximately 15km intervals. Each one provides sealed parking space for at least four B-double trucks, with bins, tables, shelter and lighting.

History
Dukes Highway runs through the northern part of the Limestone Coast region of South Australia. The route and many of the settlements (including Bordertown) were established in the 1850s to supply water to horses for the gold escorts from the Victorian goldfields to Adelaide.

Gold was taken to Adelaide rather than the closer Melbourne because a higher price was offered there. The higher price was offered to stop the South Australian economy from collapsing as all the labourers were heading to the Victorian Goldfields. The 'Bullion Act' was passed and an Assay office was established in Adelaide for the assaying and stamping of gold in 1852. It is claimed that this saved South Australia from bankruptcy.

By the 1930s, the series of separate tracks had started to coalesce into the route it follows today, and was already being referred to as "the Duke's Highway" - after the Duke of York, later king George VI - but at the time the name had never been officially recognised. There was a push to name the road Tolmer Highway, after former police commissioner Alexander Tolmer of gold escort fame, but this never eventuated.

In the latter half of the 20th century, the western end of Dukes Highway was realigned to meet Mallee Highway closer to Tailem Bend than it had previously when it ran north from Coomandook on the alignment that is now known as the Old Dukes Highway to Moorlands.

Major road accidents
Dukes Highway is South Australia's deadliest major road, with 28 deaths in the 5 years to 2009. This has led to calls for road improvements to separate traffic in each direction. Point-to-point speed cameras have been installed on one section of the highway to identify drivers who flout the speed limit. Parts of the highway have had wider centre lines installed with audio tactile treatment to help drivers to realise and recover from drifting across the centre line before they encounter an oncoming vehicle. This is intended to reduce fatigue and inattention-related crashes.

Major intersections

See also

 Highways in Australia
 Highways in Victoria
 List of highways in South Australia

References

Highways in South Australia